Crassispira kamaensis is an extinct species of sea snail, a marine gastropod mollusk in the family Pseudomelatomidae, the turrids and allies.

Description

Distribution
Fossils have been found in Miocene strata (Kama Stage) of Myanmar; age range: 23.03 to 20.43 Ma

References

 E. Vredenburg. 1921. Results of a revision of some portions of Dr Noetling's second monograph on the Tertiary fauna of Burma. Records of the Geological Survey of India 51:224-302

kamaensis
Gastropods described in 1921